Blatchleya is a genus of false soldier beetles in the family Omethidae, containing a single described species, B. gracilis.

References

External links

 

Elateroidea
Monotypic Elateriformia genera
Articles created by Qbugbot